Diploderma luei is a species of lizard in the family Agamidae. The species is endemic to Taiwan.

Geographic range

Description
The snout-to-vent length (SVL) of D. luei may reach ; the total length (including the long tail) may reach .

Reproduction
D. luei is oviparous.

Etymology
The specific name, luei, comes from the name of Taiwanese herpetologist Kuang-Yang Lue, to honor his contributions to the herpetology of Taiwan.

Conservation status
D. luei is listed as a rare and valuable species in the Taiwan Wildlife Conservation Act similar to Diploderma swinhonis.

References

Diploderma
Lizards of Asia
Reptiles of Taiwan
Endemic fauna of Taiwan
Reptiles described in 1998
Taxa named by Hidetoshi Ota